Benjamin Tort (born 15 December 1992) is a French rugby league footballer currently playing for FC Lezignan in the Elite One Championship.

Playing career

International
He was selected in Spain's squad for the 2021 Men's Rugby League World Cup qualifying tournament.

References

External links
Benjamin Tort Thirteen World profile

1992 births
Living people
French rugby league players
French people of Spanish descent
Lézignan Sangliers players
Rugby league centres
Spain national rugby league team players